Matthijs 'Matty' van Toorn (29 December 1950, Rotterdam – 22 November 2007) was a Dutch football player, manager and player's agent.

Van Toorn began his playing career with Feyenoord. He played for SBV Excelsior in the 1970–71 Eerste Divisie season. He moved to Belgium where he would spend six seasons with Sporting Charleroi before joining R.S.C. Anderlecht in 1978. He would later play for R.F.C. de Liège and K. Sint-Niklase S.K.E.

Following his playing career, Van Toorn managed K.S.K. Tongeren, Union Royale Namur, Olympic and R.F.C. de Liège and later became a player's agent, discovering Taye Taiwo.

References

1950 births
2007 deaths
Dutch footballers
Van Toorn, Matty
Van Toorn, Matty
Feyenoord players
Excelsior Rotterdam players
Van Toorn, Matty
Van Toorn, Matty
Van Toorn, Matty
Van Toorn, Matty
Dutch sports agents
Association football agents
Footballers from Rotterdam
K. Sint-Niklase S.K.E. players
Association footballers not categorized by position